Bhander is a town and a nagar panchayat in Datia district in the state of Madhya Pradesh.

Geography
It has an average elevation of 211 metres (692 feet).
Bhandar or Bhander is another village in Rajasthan in Pali district and in tehsil Bali.

Demographics
 India census, Bhander had a population of 20,667. Males constitute 53% of the population and females 47%. Bhander has an average literacy rate of 68%, higher than the national average of 59.5%; with male literacy of 76% and female literacy of 59%. 16% of the population is under 6 years of age.

Transport

Road 
Bhander is well connected with Datia and also with Jhansi via state highway and National Highway. Jhansi- Kanpur Highway is around 20 km from Bhander towards Chirgaon. According to prashant goswami one more way is connected to bhander to jhansi via unnao. Which is very shortest path jhansi to bhander.

Railways

Nearest railway junction to Bhander is Jhansi Jn. which is around 50 km. Other railway stations which are closer to Bhander are Datia Railway Station and Chirgaon railway station.

Air 
The nearest airport from Bhander is Gwalior Airport in Gwalior (Madhya Pradesh. Gwalior Airport (IATA Code:GWL, ICAO Code: VIGR), also known as Rajmata Vijyaraje Scindia Vimantal, is about 100 km from Bhander. Gwalior is connected to Delhi, Mumbai and Bhopal regularly by Air India. 
More flights for major destinations like Bangalore, Chennai, Kolkata and Jaipur are expected to start soon.

Politics
The town is represented in the Madhya Pradesh Legislative Assembly by the Bhander Assembly constituency. As of 2020, its representative is Raksha Santram Saroniya, of the Bharatiya Janata Party.

References

External links
 
 ssar-to-offload-stake-in-bhander-project

Cities and towns in Datia district